The Bradford system (also known as the English Worsted Yarn Count System or spinning count or Bradford count) is a way to assess the fineness of wool.

To measure the fineness of sheep wool fibre before microscopes and lasers were used, English wool handlers in the city of Bradford described wool by estimating (with experienced eyes) how many  hanks of single-strand yarn could be made by a good spinner from a pound (0.45 kg) of "top" (cleaned combed wool with the fibres all parallel). The finer the wool, the more hanks could be spun: from a pound of "62s," for example, sixty-two such hanks could be made. Spinning counts range from about 32s for coarse carpet-wool to over 80s the finest wools.

The Bradford System is widely used among shepherds and breed associations. In 1968, the United States Department of Agriculture issued official standards (for the U.S. only, not applicable worldwide) which assigned ranges of average fibre diameter (AFD) and maximum standard deviation to each of the Bradford counts. For example, wool with average fibre diameter in micrometres from 28.60 to 30.09 was to be called "54s."

References 

Wool industry